The Stewart Creek Bridge or Bridge L6007 is a stone arch bridge in the Smithville neighborhood of Duluth, Minnesota, United States.  It was built around 1925 as part of the scenic Skyline Parkway overlooking the city.  The Stewart Creek Bridge was listed on the National Register of Historic Places in 1989 under the name Bridge No. L-6007 for its state-level significance in the theme of engineering.  It was nominated for being the most picturesque stone arch road bridge in design and setting in Minnesota.

The Stewart Creek Bridge is built of locally quarried, dark green gabbro, which is abundant in the Duluth area. The rubble spandrel walls continue back in straight lines to form the retaining walls for the approaches. The bridge railings are topped with double sawtooth-shaped rows of gabbro.

The bridge embodies mid-19th-century Picturesque traditions in its abrupt appearance on a secluded bend, high abutments emphasizing its height, arcing curve, pointed boulders lining the approach, and spiky railings.  The City of Duluth rehabilitated the bridge from 2012 to 2013.

See also
 List of bridges on the National Register of Historic Places in Minnesota
 National Register of Historic Places listings in St. Louis County, Minnesota

References

External links
 Stewart Creek Bridge (Bridge L6007)–Minnesota Department of Transportation

1925 establishments in Minnesota
Bridges completed in 1925
Buildings and structures in Duluth, Minnesota
National Register of Historic Places in St. Louis County, Minnesota
Road bridges on the National Register of Historic Places in Minnesota
Stone arch bridges in the United States
Transportation in Duluth, Minnesota